is a town located in Nagano Prefecture, Japan. , the town had an estimated population of 4,111 in 1751 households, and a population density of 19 persons per km². Nagiso is listed as one of The Most Beautiful Villages in Japan.

Geography
Nagiso is located in the Kiso Valley of southwestern Nagano Prefecture, bordered by Gifu Prefecture to the west. The Kiso River flows through the center of the town.

Surrounding municipalities
Nagano Prefecture
 Iida
 Ōkuwa
 Achi
Gifu Prefecture
 Nakatsugawa

Climate
The town has a climate characterized by characterized by hot and humid summers, and cold winters (Köppen climate classification Cfa).

History
The area of present-day Nagiso was part of ancient Shinano Province. During the Edo period, the area developed as series of post stations on the Nakasendō highway connecting Edo with Kyoto.  The villages of Yomikaki, Tsumagoi and Tadachi merged to form the town of Nagiso on May 1, 1968.

Demographics
Per Japanese census data, the population of Nagiso has remained declined rapidly over the past 60 years.

Education
Nagiso has one public elementary schools and one public middle school operated by the town government, and one high school operated the Nagano Prefectural Board of Education.

Transportation

Railway
 JR Tōkai - Chūō Main Line
  -  -

Highway

Local attractions
Tsumago-juku
Midono-juku
Hidachi Falls, one of the 100 Famous Waterfalls of Japan

References

External links

Official Website 

 
Towns in Nagano Prefecture